Aphyodite is a genus of characin in the family Characidae. It contains three species. It was originally described as a monotypic genus containing only Aphyodite grammica, which is endemic to the Essequibo River basin in Guyana; however, two more species were described in 2017: Aphyodite apiaka from the Solimões river basin and Aphyodite tupebas from the Madeira river basin.

Species 
There are currently three described species in Aphyodite:

 Aphyodite apiaka 
 Aphyodite grammica 
 Aphyodite tupebas

References
 

Characidae
Monotypic ray-finned fish genera
Fish of South America
Endemic fauna of Guyana
Taxa named by Carl H. Eigenmann
Fish described in 1912